First United Methodist Church of Orlando is a church located in Downtown Orlando. Founded in 1882, First United Methodist Church has been a presence in Central Florida for over 125 years. The church has helped found many non-profit and charitable organizations, including the Coalition for the Homeless  and IDignity.

After a sale of property to the City of Orlando and the Dr. Phillips Center for the Performing Arts, First United Methodist Church of Orlando undertook a multimillion-dollar building project that revitalized its campus and changed the look of downtown. The new ministry building for First United Methodist Church of Orlando opened in September 2011 and held a special dedication on October 2, 2011.

References

External links 
 First Church Orlando website
 First Church Orlando on Twitter
 First Church Orlando on Facebook
 Florida United Methodist Conference website

United Methodist churches in Florida
Churches in Orlando, Florida
Churches in Orange County, Florida
1882 establishments in Florida